Laurits Munch-Petersen (born on July 19, 1973; in Copenhagen) is a Danish film director who graduated from The National Film School of Denmark with his Oscar-winning diploma film "Between Us" (Mellem Os) in 2004. This film won 13 international film awards and became the most award-winning film in the history of The National Film School of Denmark.

Laurits directed several films and series including the feature film Ambulance (2005), Seducer's Fall (2007), Over the Edge (2012), Shadow of a Hero (2015), Dolphin (2017), On the Road with Dad (2018), etc.

In 2021 Laurits' feature film "Ambulance" was remade as Ambulance by Hollywood director Michael Bay ("Armageddon", "Pearl Harbour", "Transformers") starring Jake Gyllenhaal ("Brokeback Mountain", "Nightcrawler", "Nocturnal Animals").

Laurits is the son of the internationally acclaimed Danish designer Ursula Munch-Petersen and Danish painter Erik Hagens, and grandson of legendary Danish painter and poet Gustaf Munch-Petersen who was shot at only 26 years old in the Spanish Civil War in 1938.

Laurits has three daughters: Iris Munch-Petersen (born 2009) Lucia Munch-Petersen (born 2013) and Mila Munch-Petersen (born 2018). Iris and Lucia appear in his film "Shadow of a Hero" (2015) and his children's TV series "On the Road with Dad" (2018), which became the most viewed TV-series on DR Ramasjang in 2018.

In 2009, Laurits signed a petition in support of film director Roman Polanski, calling for his release after Polanski was arrested in Switzerland in relation to his 1977 charge for drugging and raping a 13-year-old girl.

Laurits is currently working on his new TV series "Crasher" which is freely based on Søren Kierkegaard "Seducers Diary", this series is planned to premiere in 2022.

Filmography
 On the Road with Dad (2019) - TV-series
 Dolphin (2017) - Short film
 Shadow of a Hero (2015) - Feature film
 Over the Edge (2012) - Feature film
 The 7 Killings (2010) - TV series
 Hurry Home (2009) - Documentary feature film
 Seducer's Fall (2008) - Documentary feature film
 Ambulance (2005) Feature film
 Between Us (2003) - Short film - Oscar-winner
 Livshunger (2002) - TV series, Actor
 The Good Son (2001) - Short film
 Three on a Bike (2001) - Short film
 Tempo (1998) - Short film
 It's a Game (1998) - Short film
 The Circle (1996) - Feature film shot in Mexico
 Lisa's Day (1994) - Short film
 A Woman in Every Town (1993) - Short film

References

External links
 

1973 births
Living people
Danish film directors